A Buddy Story is a 2010 independent film directed by Marc Erlbaum.  It stars Gavin Bellour, Mad Men’s Elisabeth Moss and Matisyahu, a popular American reggae and alternative rock musician who makes his screen debut in the movie.

Plot
Buddy Gilbert (Gavin Bellour) is a struggling musician living in NYC. He spends his days touring the northeast with his pet turtle, playing community centers, dive bars and coffee shops because, he says, it beats a 9-to-5.

One day, Buddy overhears his neighbor Susan (Elisabeth Moss) get in a particularly bad argument with her boyfriend and, although he barely knows her, he finds himself taking her out for some cheer-me-up ice cream.

When Buddy is leaving the following day for a tour, Susan asks if she can tag along, if for no other reason than to get out of the city a while.  Hesitant at first, Buddy obliges, and finds himself spending a week traveling around with someone who, just days before, was no more than "the girl on the other side of the wall".

From a rough biker bar to a 100-year-old birthday party and other odd stops along the way, record label rejections to family connections, Buddy and Susan make their way from NYC to Philadelphia's Main Line, and they come to realize that it's not the road's end that matters, but rather the road itself.

Cast
Gavin Bellour as Buddy
Elisabeth Moss as Susan
Lee Garlington as Susan's Mom
Matisyahu as Chassid
Annabelle Gurwitch as Rita
Tovah Feldshuh as Buddy's Mom
Tim Guinee as Pete
Dick Latessa as Grandfather
Catherine A. Callahan as Fiona
Geoffrey Wigdor as Raging Randy
Toni Romano as Diner Waitress
Maureen Torsney-Weir as Bar Owner
Michael Elian as the Handimart Cashier
Stink Fisher as Biker
Richard Alliger as Bartender
Anne Gray Butler as Old Lady
Ginny Graham as Greta
Peter Patrikios as AAA Guy
Sarah Megan Thomas as Dara
Annie McCain Engman as Bar Patron

Film festivals
 Premier, 19th Philadelphia Film Festival in October 2010.
 Selection, 2011 Heartland Film Festival, Indianapolis, Indiana.
 Selection, 2011 Gig Harbor Film Festival, Gig Harbor, Washington.

Release
In early 2012, Warner Brothers acquired the rights for the video-on-demand release of A Buddy Story.

Music
 "Just Not Fair" by Gavin Bellour
 "New York City" by Teddy Goldstein
 "Cha Coal" by Chris Falson
 "Milk & Honey" by Gavin Bellour
 "I Don’t Wanna" by Marc Erlbaum
 "Backseat" by Teddy Goldstein
 "Tomorrow" by Martin Charnin & Charles Strouse
 "Psalms For Lovers Without Lovers" by Gavin Bellour & Million/Billion
 "Peabody" by Teddy Goldstein
 "Carried Away" by Marc Scibilia
 "Walls" by Marc Erlbaum
 "I've Been Knockin" by Chris Falson
 "Sin Atra" by Chris Falson
 "You Made Me Love You" by Joseph McCarthy & Jimmu Monaco
 "Be Set Free" by Josh Garrels & Brad Corrigan
 "The Alphabet Song" by Gavin Bellour & Dr. Seuss

References

External links
 
 

2010 films
2010 directorial debut films
2010 independent films
American independent films
2010s English-language films
2010s American films